The September 1927 Irish general election to the 6th Dáil was held on Thursday, 15 September, following the dissolution of the 5th Dáil on 25 August.

The 6th Dáil met on 11 October 1927 to nominate the President of the Executive Council and Executive Council of the Irish Free State for appointment by the Governor-General. Outgoing president W. T. Cosgrave was re-appointed leading a new minority government of Cumann na nGaedheal with the support of the Farmers' Party.

Campaign
The second general election of 1927 was caused by the uncertain political arithmetic within Dáil Éireann. Only three votes separated the two largest parties, Cumann na nGaedheal and Fianna Fáil, and the government was very unstable. When, during August, Fianna Fáil entered the Dáil, it gave its support to the Labour Party's motion of no confidence in the Cumann na nGaedheal government and to replace it with a Labour-led coalition with Labour leader Thomas Johnson as President of the Executive Council. The Labour Party was supported by Fianna Fáil and the National League Party. On the other hand, the Cumann na nGaedheal government had the backing of the Farmers' Party and most of the Independent TDs. When the vote was taken, John Jinks, a National League TD, failed to attend. The Deputy Leader of the Labour Party, Thomas J. O'Connell, was away in Canada at the time and also was unable to participate in the crucial vote. As a result, the vote was a dead heat and the Ceann Comhairle voted with the government. The motion failed.

On 25 August, Cumann na nGaedheal won two by-elections. W. T. Cosgrave called a general election on 27 August in the hope of securing an increased majority. Cumann na nGaedheal fought the election on its record in government so far. They recruited four TDs who had supported Cosgrave in the vote of confidence to stand as candidates for the party: Bryan Cooper (Dublin County), John Daly (Cork East), Myles Keogh (Dublin City South) and Vincent Rice (Dublin City South). Fianna Fáil campaigned on a promise of self-sufficiency. The Labour Party had done well on its last outing and was hoping, and was predicted, to win extra seats, in spite of internal divisions. The Farmers' Party represented the needs of agricultural labourers. Sinn Féin, weakened after de Valera had split to form Fianna Fáil, had been reduced to five seats in the June 1927 election, and did not contest the September 1927 election, due to lack of financial assets.

Result

|}

Voting summary

Seats summary

Government formation
Cumann na nGaedheal formed the 4th Executive Council of the Irish Free State, a minority government, with the support of the Farmers' Party and Independent TDs, with W. T. Cosgrave serving again as President of the Executive Council. The leader of the Farmers' Party served as a Parliamentary Secretary. In 1930, the Executive Council would resign following the loss of a vote on legislation. The 5th Executive Council of the Irish Free State was formed soon after with the same composition.

Changes in membership

First time TDs
William Aird
Seán Brady
Robert Briscoe
Edmond Carey
Michael Connolly
Eamonn Cooney
Peter de Loughry
Patrick Gorry
Stephen Jordan
William Kent
Arthur Matthews
Joseph Mongan
Daniel O'Leary
Martin Sexton
Richard Walsh

Outgoing TDs
The Labour Party leader, Thomas Johnson, lost his seat in the election and retired from politics.

Austin Stack (Retired)
Kathleen Clarke (Lost seat)
John Jinks (Lost seat)
Thomas Johnson (Lost seat)
Timothy Quill (Lost seat)
J. J. Walsh (Retired)

Notes

References

Ireland
General election, 1927b
General election, 1927b
General elections in the Republic of Ireland
6th Dáil
Irish general election